Azem or variation, may refer to:

Places
 Ezem (also "Azem"), an unidentified site in the Negev of Judah toward the Edomite border, in the King James Bible spelled as "Azem" in Joshua and "Ezem" in Chronicles (4:29)
 Azem Palace, Damascus, Syria
 Azem Palace (Hama), Hama, Syria
 , village in the commune of Andek of Cameroon's North-West region.
 , village in the commune of Lomié, Upper Lyong of Cameroon's East region.

People
 Azem (given name)
 As'ad Pasha al-'Azem (1706–1758), Ottoman governor of Damascus
 Khaled al-Azem (1903–1965), Syrian prime minister
 Sadeq Jalal Al Azem (1934–2016), Syrian professor
  (born 1990), French actress
 Slimane Azem (1918–1983), Algerian singer

Other uses
 Azem Alliance, an Iraqi political party

See also 

 
 Azéma
 Azeem
 Azm (disambiguation)
 Azim (disambiguation)
 Asem (disambiguation)
 Aseem